The Baldovin is a right tributary of the river Crișul Alb in Romania. It discharges into the Crișul Alb in Baia de Criș.

References

Rivers of Romania
Rivers of Hunedoara County